Patrick Finucane (21 March 1949 – 12 February 1989) was an Irish lawyer who specialised in criminal defence work. Finucane came to prominence due to his successful challenge of the British government in several important human rights cases during the 1980s. He was killed by loyalist paramilitaries from the Ulster Defence Association, acting in collusion with British security services. In 2011, British Prime Minister David Cameron met with Pat Finucane's family and admitted the collusion, although no member of the British security services has yet been prosecuted.

Finucane's killing was one of the most controversial during the Troubles in Northern Ireland. He was shot fourteen times as he sat eating a meal at his Belfast home with his three children and his wife, who was also wounded during the attack. In September 2004, Ken Barrett an Ulster Defence Association member who was recruited as an informer by the Royal Ulster Constabulary's Special Branch after confessing the shooting, pleaded guilty to his murder.

After significant international pressure, the British government eventually announced a public inquiry. This was one result of the agreement made between the British and Irish governments at Weston Park in 2001. The British government said it would comply with the terms agreed by the two governments at Weston Park. They agreed to appoint an international judge that would review Finucane's case and if evidence of collusion was found, a public inquiry would be recommended. The British government reneged on this promise to Finucane's family after the international judge found evidence of collusion. Finucane's wife Geraldine declared in court papers that UK Prime Minister David Cameron stated, at a meeting with Finucane's family in London, that: "It is true that the previous administration could not deliver a public inquiry and neither can we. There are people in buildings all around here who won't let it happen."

Two public investigations concluded that elements of the British security forces colluded in Finucane's murder and there have been high-profile calls for a public inquiry. However, in October 2011, it was announced that a planned public inquiry would be replaced by a less wide-ranging review. This review, led by Sir Desmond de Silva, released a report in December 2012 acknowledging that the case entailed "a wilful and abject failure by successive Governments". Finucane's family called the De Silva report a "sham".

Background
Finucane was born into a prominent republican family on the Falls Road, Belfast. He was the eldest child, with six brothers—John, Liam, Gerard, Seamus, Martin and Dermot–and a sister, Rosaleen. At the start of the Troubles, his family was forced out of their home. He graduated from Trinity College Dublin in 1973. One of his brothers, John, a Provisional Irish Republican Army (IRA) member, was killed in a car crash in the Falls Road in 1972. Another brother, Dermot, successfully contested attempts to extradite him to Northern Ireland from the Republic of Ireland for his alleged part in the killing of a prison officer; he was one of 38 IRA prisoners who escaped from the Maze in 1983. A third brother Seamus was the fiancé of Mairead Farrell, one of the IRA trio shot dead by the Special Air Service (SAS) in Gibraltar in March 1988. Seamus was the leader of an IRA unit in west Belfast before his arrest in 1976 with Bobby Sands and seven other IRA men, during an attempt to destroy Balmoral's furniture store in south Belfast. He was sentenced to 14 years' imprisonment.

Finucane's wife, Geraldine, whom he met at Trinity College, is the daughter of middle-class Protestants; together they had three children. His son John is a Sinn Féin politician who was elected as Lord Mayor of Belfast in May 2019 and was elected MP for Belfast North in December 2019.

Finucane was also a footballer, and played as a striker in the Irish League for Crusaders and Distillery.

Legal defence challenges 

Pat Finucane's best-known client was the IRA hunger striker Bobby Sands. He also represented other IRA and Irish National Liberation Army hunger strikers who died during the 1981 Maze prison protest, Brian Gillen, and the widow of Gervaise McKerr, one of three men shot dead by the Royal Ulster Constabulary (RUC) in a shoot-to-kill incident in 1982. In 1988, he represented Pat McGeown, who was charged in connection with the Corporals killings, and was photographed with McGeown outside Crumlin Road Courthouse.

Killing
On 12 February 1989, Finucane was shot dead at his home in Fortwilliam Drive, north Belfast, by Ken Barrett and another masked man using a Browning Hi-Power 9mm pistol and a .38 revolver respectively. He was hit 14 times. The two gunmen knocked down the front door with a sledgehammer and entered the kitchen where Finucane had been having a Sunday meal with his family; they immediately opened fire and shot him twice, knocking him to the floor. Then while standing over him, the leading gunman fired 12 bullets into his face at close range.

Finucane's wife Geraldine was slightly wounded in the shooting attack which their three children witnessed as they hid underneath the table. The RUC immediately launched an investigation into the killing. The senior officer heading the CID team was Detective Superintendent Alan Simpson, who set up a major incident room inside the RUC D Division Antrim Road station. Simpson's investigation ran for six weeks and he later stated that from the beginning, there had been a noticeable lack of intelligence coming from the other agencies regarding the killing. Finucane's killing was widely suspected by human rights groups to have been perpetrated in collusion with officers of the RUC and, in 2003, the British Government Stevens Report stated that the killing was indeed carried out with the collusion of police in Northern Ireland.

The Ulster Defence Association/Ulster Freedom Fighters (UDA/UFF) claimed they killed the 39-year-old lawyer because he was a high-ranking officer in the IRA. Police at his inquest said they had no evidence to support this claim. Finucane had represented republicans in many high-profile cases, but he had also represented loyalists. Several members of his family had republican links, but the family strongly denied Finucane was a member of the IRA. Informer Sean O'Callaghan has stated that he attended an IRA finance meeting attended by Finucane in Letterkenny in 1980.

In Finucane's case, both the RUC and the Stevens Report found that he was not a member of the IRA. Republicans have strongly criticised the claims made by O'Callaghan in his book 'The Informer' and subsequent newspaper articles. One Republican source says O'Callaghan "...has been forced to overstate his former importance in the IRA and to make increasingly outlandish accusations against individual republicans."

Later investigations

In 1999, the third inquiry by John Stevens into allegations of collusion between the security forces and loyalist paramilitaries concluded that there was such collusion in the murders of Finucane and Brian Adam Lambert. As a result of the inquiry, RUC Special Branch agent and loyalist quartermaster William Stobie, a member of the UDA was later charged with supplying one of the pistols used to kill Finucane, but his trial collapsed because he claimed that he had given information about his actions to his Special Branch handlers. The pistol belonged to the UDA, which until August 1992 was a legal organisation under British law. A further suspect, Brian Nelson, was a secret agent who was part of the Force Research Unit. He had provided information about Finucane's whereabouts, and also claimed that he had alerted his handlers about the planned killing.

In 2000, Amnesty International demanded that the then Secretary of State for Northern Ireland, Peter Mandelson, open a public inquiry into events surrounding his death. In 2001, as a result of the Weston Park talks, a retired Canadian Judge Peter Cory was appointed by the governments of Britain and Ireland to investigate the allegations of collusion by British and Irish security forces in the killing of Finucane, Robert Hamill, Harry Breen, Bob Buchanan and other individuals during the Troubles. Cory reported in April 2004, and recommended public enquiries be established including the case of the Finucane killing. The hard drives of Cory's inquiry were wiped by MI5 "in the interests of national security" in 2002.

In 2004, Ken Barrett pleaded guilty to Finucane's murder. His conviction came after a taped confession to the police, lost since 1991, re-surfaced.

In June 2005, the then Irish Taoiseach Bertie Ahern told Mitchell Reiss, the US Special Envoy to Northern Ireland, that "everyone knows" the UK government was involved in the murder of Pat Finucane. On 17 May 2006, the United States House of Representatives then passed a resolution calling on the British government to hold an independent public inquiry into Finucane's killing.

Initial investigations
A public inquiry was announced by the British Government in 2007, but Finucane's family criticised its limited remit and announced that they would not co-operate. Amnesty International has reiterated its call for an independent inquiry, and have called on members of the British judiciary not to serve on the inquiry if it is held under the terms of the 2005 Inquiries Act.

Finucane's widow, Geraldine, has written letters repeating this request to all the senior judges in Great Britain, and took out a full-page advertisement in the newspaper The Times to draw attention to the campaign. In June 2007, it was reported that no members of the security forces would be charged in connection with the killing.

On 11 October 2011, members of the Finucane family met with Prime Minister David Cameron in Downing Street. Cameron provided them with an official apology for state collusion into Pat Finucane's death. Following the meeting, Finucane's son Michael said that he and the family had been "genuinely shocked" to learn that the Cory recommendation of a public enquiry, previously accepted by Tony Blair, would not be followed, and that a review of the Stevens and Cory casefiles would be undertaken instead. Geraldine Finucane described the proposal as "nothing less than an insult...a shoddy, half-hearted alternative to a proper public inquiry". The following day, the official apology was given publicly in the House of Commons by the Secretary of State for Northern Ireland, Owen Paterson.

Based on conversations she had had with Peter Cory, Finucane's widow subsequently claimed that Margaret Thatcher, the UK Prime Minister at the time of the murder, "knew exactly what was going on". She claimed that Cory had told her that he had seen papers marked 'for cabinet eyes only', and they involved collusion and the killing of her husband.

De Silva report
On 12 December 2012, the government released the Pat Finucane Review, the results of the inquiry conducted by Sir Desmond de Silva. The report documented extensive evidence of State collaboration with loyalist gunmen, including the selection of targets, and concluded that "there was a wilful and abject failure by successive governments to provide the clear policy and legal framework necessary for agent-handling operations to take place effectively within the law."

Prime Minister David Cameron acknowledged "shocking levels of collusion" and issued an apology. However, Finucane's family denounced the De Silva report as a "sham" and a "suppression of the truth" into which they were allowed no input. In May 2013, state documents dated 2011 disclosed through the courts revealed that David Cameron's former director of security and intelligence, Ciaran Martin, had warned him that senior members of Margaret Thatcher's government may have been aware of "a systemic problem with loyalist agents" at the time of Pat Finucane's death but had done nothing about it.

2015 lawsuit
In late 2015, three former RUC officers, Trevor McIlwrath, Johnston Brown and Alan Simpson, filed suit in the High Court in Belfast against the Police Service of Northern Ireland (PSNI), alleging that, to cover up a conspiracy, the PSNI obstructed their investigation into the murder in violation of the European Convention on Human Rights. The lawsuit alleged that a senior RUC official told Simpson, who headed the investigation, not to get "too deeply involved in this one." Simpson further alleged that a senior Special Branch official who told Simpson during the investigation that he knew nothing, was revealed by the De Silva report to actually have been privy to significant information.

Subsequent developments
In February 2019, the Supreme Court of the United Kingdom ruled in agreement with the Finucane family, finding unanimously that the UK had failed to uphold article 2 of the European convention on human rights, which among other things obliges signatories to adequately investigate state-caused deaths. On 12 October 2020, the Northern Ireland Secretary, Brandon Lewis, committed to reach a decision on or before 30 November 2020 on whether a public inquiry would be held into the murder. The British Labour Party urged the UK Government to "act without delay" in the setting up of "an independent public inquiry".

On 26 November 2020, 24 members of the United States Congress urged Boris Johnson's government to set up public inquiry into the murder of Pat Finucane. Both Republicans and Democrats accused the UK government of 'breach of faith' in the case. Four days later, Lewis rejected calls for a public inquiry, citing ongoing PSNI and police ombudsman's reviews, despite the Chief Constable of the PSNI insisting that no new evidence had come to light. Mr. Lewis stated that "now is not the time" for a public inquiry, potentially leaving the door open for an inquiry in future. Sinn Féin, the SDLP, the Alliance Party and the Green Party sent a joint letter to Lewis, calling his decision an insult to Finucane's family.

Legacy
Madden & Finucane Solicitors, established in 1979 by Finucane and Peter Madden, and  led by Madden, continues to act for those it considers to have been victims of mistreatment by the state, or their survivors.

The Pat Finucane Centre named in his honour, is a human rights advocacy and lobbying entity in Northern Ireland.

See also
 Rosemary Nelson

References

External links
Pat Finucane Inquiry Campaign – Up-to-date info on the campaign for the Pat Finucane Inquiry
Pat Finucane Archive maintained by his law firm Madden & Finucane Solicitors
Desmond Lorenz de Silva: Pat Finucane Review. Retrieved 12 November 2012.
"The Report of the Patrick Finucane Review". GOV.UK. PDF Version. Retrieved 17 January 2022.
The Pat Finucane Centre – for human rights and social change.
FINUCANE v. THE UNITED KINGDOM – 29178/95 [2003] ECHR 328 (1 July 2003) — European Court of Human Rights judgement in the case brought by Finucane's widow Geraldine
Finucane Portrait Dedicated  (Artist Robert Ballagh)

1949 births
1989 deaths
Lawyers from Belfast
Deaths by firearm in Northern Ireland
Irish solicitors
Assassinated lawyers
Murder victims from Northern Ireland
People killed by the Ulster Defence Association
People murdered in Belfast
Police misconduct in Northern Ireland
Solicitors from Northern Ireland
Terrorism deaths in Northern Ireland
1989 murders in the United Kingdom
Crusaders F.C. players
Lisburn Distillery F.C. players